Kenneth Patrick Ruscio (1954) is an American college professor of politics and leadership and was elected President of Washington and Lee University on March 7, 2006, and served through the end of 2016. He was previously Dean of the Jepson School of Leadership Studies at the University of Richmond (2002-2006), and, at Washington and Lee, served as Associate Dean of the Williams School of Commerce, Economics, and Politics and as Dean of Freshmen. He has taught courses in leadership, environmental and public policy, American national government, and environmental studies. Ruscio studied at Christian Brothers Academy in Lincroft, New Jersey, until 1972, when he entered Washington and Lee. He completed his B.A. with a major in politics and earning Omicron Delta Kappa honors. He went on to earn an M.P.A. and Ph.D. in 1978 and 1983, respectively, from Syracuse University's Maxwell School of Citizenship and Public Affairs.

Ruscio is the author of The Leadership Dilemma in Modern Democracy and has served two terms as president of Omicron Delta Kappa.

References

 .

Living people
Christian Brothers Academy (New Jersey) alumni
Presidents of Washington and Lee University
Washington and Lee University faculty
Washington and Lee University alumni
Maxwell School of Citizenship and Public Affairs alumni
University of Richmond faculty
Year of birth missing (living people)